Chronicon Scotorum, also known as Chronicum Scotorum, is a medieval Irish chronicle.

Overview
According to Nollaig Ó Muraíle, it is "a collection of annals belonging to the 'Clonmacnoise group', covering the period from prehistoric times to 1150 but with some gaps, closely related to the 'Annals of Tigernach'. It survives in a paper copy made by Dubhaltach MacFhirbhisigh c.1640 from an exemplar no longer extant."

MacFhirbhisigh's copy was held by his friend (and possible pupil) Ruaidhrí Ó Flaithbheartaigh in the late 17th century, but was in France for a time in the 1760s before its purchase by Trinity College Dublin in 1776. Edited and published by William M. Hennessy in 1866, it is accorded to be one of the more valuable Irish annals by virtue of its computistical data which were frequently distorted in other such compilations.

Gilla Críst Ua Máel Eóin has been associated with the text as its compiler, but if so, it was continued at some point after his death. His actual role in relation to the Chronicon is uncertain.

Editions
Mac Niocaill, Gearóid (ed. and tr.). Chronicon Scotorum. Edition and translation available from CELT].
Hennessy, William M. (ed. and tr.). Chronicum Scotorum. A Chronicle of Irish Affairs, from the earliest times to A.D. 1135, with a supplement containing the events from 1141 to 1150. Roll Series 46. London, 1866. Reprinted: Wiesbaden, 1964. PDF available from the Internet Archive.

References

Sources

The Encyclopaedia of Ireland, ed. Brian Lalor, Dublin, 2003.

Further reading
Evans, N. (2010) 'The Present and the Past in Medieval Irish Chronicles', Woodbridge & Rochester, Boydell & Brewer.
Grabowski, Kathryn and David N. Dumville (1984) Chronicles and annals of medieval Ireland and Wales: the Clonmacnoise group of texts. Woodbridge.
Mac Niocaill, Gearóid, (1975) The medieval Irish annals. Dublin. 18-23 and 27–8.
Mc Carthy, Daniel P. (1998) "The chronology of the Irish annals." Proceedings of the Royal Irish Academy C 98: 203–55. Available from the Royal Irish Academy.
Mc Carthy, Daniel P. Irish chronicles and their chronology. Website.
Ó Muraíle, Nollaig, (1998) The celebrated antiquary Dubhaltach Mac Fhirbhisigh (c. 1600-71). His lineage life and learning. Maynooth. 97-107 and 308–9.

Irish chronicles
12th-century history books
Texts of medieval Ireland
Irish manuscripts
Irish books